Gian Lorenzo Bernini was an Italian sculptor and architect.

Bernini may also refer to:

Bernini (surname), people with the surname
Bernini (fashion), an American clothing company
Bernini (crater), a crater on Mercury
Bernini (Turin Metro), a rapid transit station in Turin, Italy

See also